Norman Maclean (1902–1990) was an American author and scholar.

Norman Maclean may also refer to:
 Tormod MacGill-Eain (Norman Hector Mackinnon Maclean, 1936–2017), Scottish Gaelic comedian
 Norman Maclean (moderator) (1869–1952), Scottish minister and religious author
 Norman Maclean (biologist) (born 1932), professor of genetics
 Norman J. MacLean (1920–2000), Canadian politician

See also
 Norman McLean (1865–1947), Scottish Semitic and Biblical scholar
 Norm McLean (1896–1980), Australian rules footballer